Gemstone Publishing is an American company that publishes comic book price guides. The company was formed by Diamond Comic Distributors President and Chief Executive Officer Steve Geppi in 1994 when he bought Overstreet.

Gemstone published licensed Disney comic books from June 2003 until November 2008. The company has also reprinted EC Comics of the 1950s.

BOOM! Kids acquired all comic publishing licenses regarding Disney characters in the second half of 2009.

Disney comics
Gemstone's flagship publications were comic books featuring Disney characters; particularly the Donald Duck/Uncle Scrooge comics of such Duck artists as Carl Barks and Don Rosa, and the Mickey Mouse comics of Floyd Gottfredson, César Ferioli, and Romano Scarpa, among others.

While popularly known as a reprint house, Gemstone's comics were actually dominated by stories that were new to United States audiences. Vintage material, though popular with readers, was not the majority of the content.

Gemstone issued annual editions of Christmas Parade, Vacation Parade, and Spring Fever; a giveaway for Free Comic Book Day; and occasional special editions (including comic adaptations of Mickey, Donald, Goofy: The Three Musketeers and Mickey's Twice Upon a Christmas).

Gemstone's first large-size book collection, Mickey And The Gang: Classic Stories In Verse, was issued in November 2005. It was a compilation, edited by David Gerstein, of Disney cartoon story pages published from 1934 to 1944 in Good Housekeeping magazine. Gerstein later edited two Gemstone softcover books that were official tie-ins to the Walt Disney Treasures DVD collections: Disney Comics: 75 Years of Innovation (2006) and Uncle Scrooge: A Little Something Special (2008).

Russ Cochran and EC Comics reprints
Gemstone has also published reprints of EC Comics. Gemstone's Comic Book Marketplace-editor Russ Cochran had previously published (in 1973) a dozen reprints of EC titles including Crypt of Terror, Weird Science, The Haunt of Fear, The Vault of Horror, etc., before moving to Gladstone Publishing and then to Gemstone, which has been the home of Cochran's EC reprints for over 15 years.

Reprinting the Cochran/Gladstone-reprints of The Haunt of Fear, The Vault of Horror and Weird Science (all 1992), Gemstone also republished (in single issue and 'annual' - four issues per 'annual' - format): 
Crime SuspenStories, Shock SuspenStories, Two-Fisted Tales, Weird Fantasy and Weird Science-Fantasy in 1992;
Incredible Science Fiction (1994)
Frontline Combat (1995)
Panic (1997)
Piracy and Valor (1998)
Aces High, Impact, M.D. and Psychoanalysis (1999), and
Crime Patrol and Extra! in 2000.

Oversize, hardback, slip-cased collections of these comics had been previously published in black & white by Cochran during the 1980s as "The Complete EC Library". This Library was then added to by Cochran/Gemstone with 2005's Picto-Fiction collection, comprising the EC comics: Confessions Illustrated, Crime Illustrated, Shock Illustrated and Terror Illustrated, along with "18 previously unseen stories, never published before".

Full-color hardbacks

In 2006, Cochran and Gemstone began publication of a series of full-color EC Archives editions. Promising that "[e]ach EC Archive volume will reprint six complete issues (24 stories)", the first volumes of Weird Science and Shock Suspenstories both saw print in December, 2006, with forewords from (respectively) EC fans George Lucas and Steven Spielberg. Ostensibly beginning to publish two volumes every two months, the schedule changed to one-per-month and recently one every couple of months.

In addition, "Deluxe" versions of Weird Science Vol.s 1 & 2 (both signed by artist Al Feldstein), Shock Suspenstories Vol. 1 and Tales From the Crypt Vol. 1 have been published.

Closing
In early 2009, the future of Gemstone Publishing was unclear, after reports of unpaid printing bills, particularly from the EC Archives. In April, Geppi responded to the uncertainty, noting that while there had been "a reduction in staff at Gemstone," such moves did "not [signal] the end of Gemstone Publishing." Seven months after Geppi's optimistic statements, the last batch of Gemstone's Disney comics appeared in November 2008, complete with previews for next month's issues that Gemstone was to fail publishing. BOOM! Kids acquired all comic publishing licenses regarding Disney characters, and started publishing comic titles previously owned by Gemstone in the second half of 2009. Starting in 2013, Dark Horse comics began to reprint E.C. comics picking up where Gemstone left off, in the same full color hardback format.

References

External links 
Official website
Gemstone Publishing's Official Disney Comics site

Interview with editor John Clark on the launch of Gemstone's Disney comics line

 
EC Comics
Comic book publishing companies of the United States
Disney comics publishers